A cabinet department or prime minister's department is a department or other government agency that directly supports the work of the government's central executive office, usually the cabinet and/or prime minister, rather than specific ministerial portfolios. Such a department is present in many parliamentary democracies. The department is roughly equivalent in function to a president's office in a presidential system of government or an office of the council of ministers in a semi-presidential system.

Typology 
In many countries, such a department is called a Prime Minister's Office. In some other countries, there is a Cabinet Office. In the United Kingdom, the Prime Minister's Office is a part of the Cabinet Office; in Australia and New Zealand, there is a single department called the Department of the Prime Minister and Cabinet. In some countries, such as Germany and Poland, the department supporting the prime minister (the Chancellor in Germany) is called the chancellery.

Self-governing states and provinces within federations that are parliamentary democracies often have similar departments, such as a premier's department or, in Australia, Department of the Premier and Cabinet.

List of cabinet or prime minister's departments
 Australia: Department of the Prime Minister and Cabinet
 New South Wales: Department of Premier and Cabinet
 Queensland: Department of the Premier and Cabinet (Queensland)
 South Australia: Department of the Premier and Cabinet
 Victoria: Department of Premier and Cabinet
 Bangladesh:
 Prime Minister's Office
 Cabinet Division
 Brunei: Prime Minister's Office
 Canada: 
 Office of the Prime Minister
 Privy Council Office
 China: 
 General Office of the State Council
 Germany: German Chancellery
 Iceland: Prime Minister's Office
 India: Prime Minister's Office
 Ireland: Department of the Taoiseach
 Israel: Prime Minister's Office
 Italy: Council of Ministers
 Japan:
Cabinet Secretariat 
Cabinet Office
 Malaysia: Prime Minister's Department
 Mongolia: Cabinet Office
 Netherlands: Ministry of General Affairs
 New Zealand: Department of the Prime Minister and Cabinet
 Norway: Office of the Prime Minister
Philippines:
Office of the President
Cabinet Secretariat
 Poland: Chancellery of the Prime Minister of Poland
 Portugal: Presidency of the Council of Ministers
 Singapore: Prime Minister's Office
 Sri Lanka: 
 Cabinet Office
 Prime Minister's Office
 Thailand: Office of the Prime Minister
 United Kingdom: 
 Cabinet Office
 Prime Minister's Office
 United States: Executive Office of the President of the United States

Former
 Northern Ireland: Department of the Prime Minister

See also
 Privy Council Office (United Kingdom)
 Federal Chancellery of Switzerland

 
Ministries